Community Unit School District 308 is a public school district located in Oswego, Kendall County, Illinois. The Superintendent of Schools is John Sparlin. The district headquarters is in Oswego, Illinois. The district includes 22 schools, including one early learning center, 14 elementary schools for grades K-5, 5 junior high schools for grades 6–8, and 2 high schools. The district serves Oswego, Aurora, Montgomery, Plainfield, Yorkville, and Joliet.  Total enrollment as of 2012 was about 18,000 students. Oswego 308 is the seventh largest public school district in Illinois out of 868.

Schools
Oswego Community Unit School District 308 currently has 22 schools in total in operation.

Preschool

Elementary schools

Junior High schools

High schools

External links
 Official site

References

Education in Kendall County, Illinois
Education in Aurora, Illinois
Education in Joliet, Illinois
Plainfield, Illinois
School districts in Illinois